The Northeast Football Conference is a football conference for NJCAA teams located in the northeast United States.

Current members

Former members
Berean Institute (disbanded)
Cayuga County CC (disbanded)
Alfred State (NCAA Division III)
Dean (NCAA Division III)
Erie CC (independent)
Nassau (independent)
Hudson Valley CC (independent)
Louisburg (independent)
SUNY-Canton (NCAA Division III)
SUNY-Morrisville (NCAA Division III)

Champions

External links
 Northeast Football Conference

NJCAA conferences
College football-only conferences in the United States